The Tour Carpe Diem is a  tall skyscraper in the La Défense business district, near Paris in France.

The first stone was laid early 2011 by the main contractor BESIX and Spie Batignolles. Completed in 2013, it is located in the municipality of Courbevoie and contains offices.

Awards
The building was nominated for an Architizer award in 2015.

See also
List of tallest buildings and structures in the Paris region

References

Buildings and structures in Hauts-de-Seine
Skyscraper office buildings in France
Robert A. M. Stern buildings
La Défense
Office buildings completed in 2013
21st-century architecture in France